Al Letson (born August 8, 1972) is an American writer, journalist, and radio and podcast host. Since 2013, he has served as the host of the radio show and podcast Reveal from the Center for Investigative Reporting and PRX. Before that, he created and hosted the show State of the Re:Union, distributed by National Public Radio and PRX.

Early life and career
Letson was born in Plainfield, New Jersey, the son of a minister. At the age of twelve he moved with his family to Orange Park, Florida, a suburb of Jacksonville. As a teenager he became interested in recording and hip hop, spending much of his free time in the studio and participating in Jacksonville's music and arts scene. After graduating from Orange Park High School, he took a job as a flight attendant for American Airlines, allowing him to participate in poetry slams across the country.

Performance poetry
Letson regularly appeared in slam poetry performances across the country and on TV including Russell Simmons's Def Poetry Jam, and CBS's Final Four Pre-Game Show. In 2000, he won the Atlanta Grand Slam and placed third in the National Poetry Slam competition.

Playwriting
Letson began writing plays and acting, and in 2001, he produced his first one-man show, Essential Personnel, in Jacksonville. The show earned him commissions for his work and performances across the country. In 2004, the Baltimore School for the Arts commissioned him to write Chalk, a "poetical" combining stage acting with poetry. Other plays include Griot and Julius X, a retelling of William Shakespeare's Julius Caesar set in Harlem in 1965. His solo show Summer in Sanctuary opened Off-Broadway at the Abingdon Theatre Company in 2011 

In 2007, Letson produced a short film which he released on the internet. This led to an appearance on the Fox film-themed reality show On the Lot.

Public radio

In 2007, Letson discovered a radio competition called the Public Radio Talent Quest. The program, organized by the Public Radio Exchange (PRX) and the Corporation for Public Broadcasting (CPB), used the competition as an open search for new public radio talent. The five-round competition began with more than 1,400 applicants and was voted on by fans, professionals and celebrity judges. Letson submitted a pilot for State of the Re:Union, and was chosen as one of three winners. From there, Letson's State of the Re:Union and Glynn Washington's Snap Judgement Radio were awarded funding by the CPB.

The first season of State of the Re:Union aired in 2010 and the show continued for six seasons, ending in 2015. State of the Re:Union won 3 consecutive Edward R. Murrow awards, 2 NABJ Awards, 3 NLGJA Awards, and a Peabody in 2015.

In 2013, Letson hosted pilots of Reveal, a podcast/public radio show from PRX and The Center for Investigative Reporting. The first pilot of Reveal received a Peabody and went into full production in 2014. Letson went on to become the full-time host of the program. He received the 2020 Gerald Loeb Award for Audio for the episode "Amazon: Behind the Smiles".

In 2016, Letson began hosting his own story podcast, Errthang Show!.

In 2021, hosted a radio show Mississippi Goddam: The Ballad of Billy Joe (nominated for Peabody Award).

Comics 
Letson credits comic books with teaching him how to read and helping him conquer dyslexia. He worked on two independent comic books, Imperfect and Planetfall. In 2016, he was chosen by DC Comics to participate in the 2nd DC Comic writer's workshop. Letson and his cohorts learned DC's production methods and were given the opportunity to write for the company. His first story for DC came out in November 2017.

Rally Against Hate 
On August 27, 2017, Letson intervened to stop a man from being beaten during a protest. During a Berkeley, California "Rally Against Hate" demonstration that he was covering, Letson saw five masked protesters beating an unarmed man with sticks. Fearing for the man's life, Letson used his body as a human shield and encouraged the protesters to discontinue their attacks.

References

Living people
1972 births
American male poets
21st-century American dramatists and playwrights
American radio producers
American public radio personalities
African-American radio personalities
Writers from Jacksonville, Florida
American male dramatists and playwrights
People from Plainfield, New Jersey
People from Orange Park, Florida
21st-century American male writers
21st-century American poets
Gerald Loeb Award winners for Audio and Video
21st-century African-American writers
20th-century African-American people